Shut 'Em Down may refer to:

 Shut 'Em Down (album), an album by rap group Onyx
 "Shut 'em Down" (Onyx song), the title song
 "Shut 'Em Down" (Public Enemy song), 1991
 "Shut 'Em Down" (LL Cool J song), 2000
 "Shut 'Em Down 2002", a song by Busta Rhymes from the 2001 album Genesis (Busta Rhymes album)

See also
Shut It Down (disambiguation)